José Emilio Santamaría Iglesias (born 31 July 1929) is a Uruguayan retired football central defender and manager.

He spent his 18-year career with Nacional and Real Madrid, winning a combined 17 titles including four European Cups with the latter club.

Born in Uruguay, Santamaría represented both the Uruguay and Spain national teams. He later embarked in a managerial career, which included a two-year spell managing Spain.

Club career
Born in Montevideo to Spanish parents, Santamaría played for local Club Nacional de Football in his country, winning five national championships during his spell. In 1957 the 28-year-old moved abroad, signing with Real Madrid where he remained until the end of his career.

In his first season with the Merengues, Santamaría contributed with 34 appearances the La Liga and European Cup tournaments combined, with both ending in conquest. He went on to add a further ten major trophies to his collection, being first-choice for the vast majority of his stint.

Having earned the nickname 'The Wall' for his consistent defensive displays, Santamaría retired at the end of the 1965–66 campaign at the age of nearly 37, featuring twice in that year's European Cup en route to another triumph (against Feyenoord and at Kilmarnock). He played 337 competitive matches for Real Madrid.

Santamaría was appointed at Barcelona's RCD Español in the summer of 1971, for his first club coaching experience. He led the Catalans to two top-four finishes during his six-year tenure, including a third-place in the 1972–73 season just three points behind champions Atlético Madrid, being sacked on 21 December 1977 following a 4–0 away loss against Racing de Santander.

International career
Santamaría was first called up to play for Uruguay for the 1950 FIFA World Cup in Brazil, being selected to fill an inside forward slot in the squad but seeing the request denied by his club on the grounds that he was a defender. Four years later, however, he was an integral part of the national team setup at the World Cup in Switzerland, helping them to a final fourth position and earning a total of 20 caps.

Santamaría began representing Spain in 1958, his debut coming on 15 October against Northern Ireland (6–2 friendly win in Madrid). He appeared with his adopted nation at the 1962 World Cup, playing against Czechoslovakia (1–0 loss) and Mexico (1–0 triumph) in an eventual group stage exit.

After working with the youth sides and spending two years with the under-21s, Santamaría was appointed manager of the full team for the 1982 World Cup, due to be played on home soil. He was relieved of his duties at the end of the competition as Spain were unable to progress from the second group phase, and quit football altogether to pursue other interests.

Honours

Nacional
Uruguayan Primera División: 1950, 1952, 1955, 1956, 1957

Real Madrid
La Liga: 1957–58, 1960–61, 1961–62, 1962–63, 1963–64, 1964–65
Copa del Rey: 1962
European Cup: 1957–58, 1958–59, 1959–60, 1965–66
Intercontinental Cup: 1960

Individual
FIFA World Cup: All-Star Team 1954
World Soccer World XI: 1960

See also
List of Spain international footballers born outside Spain

References

External links

Official website

1929 births
Living people
Uruguayan people of Spanish descent
Footballers from Montevideo
Uruguayan footballers
Spanish footballers
Association football defenders
Club Nacional de Football players
Real Madrid CF players
Uruguayan Primera División players
La Liga players
UEFA Champions League winning players
Uruguay international footballers
Spain international footballers
Dual internationalists (football)
1954 FIFA World Cup players
1962 FIFA World Cup players
Uruguayan expatriate footballers
Uruguayan expatriate sportspeople in Spain
Expatriate footballers in Spain
Spanish football managers
Uruguayan football managers
RCD Espanyol managers
Spain national under-21 football team managers
Spanish Olympic coaches
Spain national football team managers
La Liga managers
1982 FIFA World Cup managers
Uruguayan expatriate football managers
Expatriate football managers in Spain